The 1973 Capital City 500 was a NASCAR Winston Cup Series race that took place on September 9, 1973, at Richmond Fairgrounds Raceway (now Richmond Raceway) in Richmond, Virginia.  Richard Petty won the race by two laps after leading 429 of 500 laps.

Race report
Richard Petty defeated Cale Yarborough by at least two laps in front of 18000 spectators; five of which were by at least one lap. After running second to Bobby Allison in the spring 1974 race, he won again in the fall 1974 and spring 1975 races, the latter by six laps. It took four hours and thirteen minutes to finish the 500-lap race with the track spanning exactly . Petty had won six other races at this track before extending his lucky streak to 7 at the end of this event.

Five cautions slowed the race for 123 laps. Baxter Price finished in last-place due to a crash that also took out nine other cars at the start of lap 4. Out of the 34 races on the grid, 33 were born in the United States while Vic Parsons was born in Canada. J.D. McDuffie, Richard Childress and Darrell Waltrip also participated in this race.

Nearly a quarter of the race was run under the yellow flag despite the fact that there were only five caution periods during the race. There were threatening skies from the green flag; causing most of the race to be done under the yellow flag. No attempt was made to postpone the race or to call it "official." A record amount of 86 laps were done under caution until the skies became blue again. Besides the weather, a red flag also held up the race for 70 minutes as Price and Bill Champion, who was also involved in a fiery crash had to go to the hospital for their respective injuries.

Post-race coverage was done by the local newspaper The Daily Times-News from Burlington, North Carolina.

Qualifying

Top 10 finishers

Timeline
Section reference: 
 Start of race: Bobby Allison had the pole position to start the event.
 Lap 3: Baxter Price became the last-place finisher of the race due with engine problems.
 Lap 13: D.K. Ulrich fell out with engine failure.
 Lap 33: Dick May lost the rear end of his racing vehicle.
 Lap 51: Richard Petty took over the lead from Bobby Allison.
 Lap 64: Bobby Allison took over the lead from Richard Petty.
 Lap 66: Cale Yarborough took over the lead from Bobby Allison; Ronnie Daniel transmission troubles.
 Lap 83: Richard Petty took over the lead from Cale Yarborough.
 Lap 114: Earl Brooks out after head gasket failed.
 Lap 175: Ed Negre's engine failed.
 Lap 179: Bobby Allison took over the lead from Richard Petty.
 Lap 181: Richard Petty took over the lead from Bobby Allison.
 Lap 203: John Sears engine overheated.
 Lap 305: Mel Larson's engine troubles.
 Lap 343: Jabe Thomas crashed, forcing him to exit the race prematurely.
 Lap 383: David Sisco crashed, forcing him to exit the race prematurely.
 Lap 411: Elmo Langley engine failed.
 Finish: Richard Petty was officially declared the winner of the event.

References

Capital City 500
Capital City 500
NASCAR races at Richmond  Raceway